Tom Werman (born 1945) is an American former record producer responsible for many hard rock and heavy metal albums.

Early life and education
Werman was born in Boston, Massachusetts, and grew up in Newton. He earned a bachelor's degree and an MBA from Columbia University; he played guitar in college.

Producing career
In 1970, bored with his work in advertising, he sent a letter to Clive Davis at CBS Records and landed a job at Epic Records as an A&R man. His discoveries included Boston, Cheap Trick, REO Speedwagon, and Ted Nugent, whose first album he co-produced as his first production credit. He also brought Kiss, Lynyrd Skynyrd, and Rush to Epic, but the label passed on all three.

After combining A&R with record producing at Epic until the end of 1982, Werman moved to Elektra Records the following year, but left after four months and continued in producing as an independent; he also worked for a while as an executive at Capitol Records. He retired from the music business in 2001 after producing the music and soundtrack for the film Rock Star, starring Mark Wahlberg and Jennifer Aniston.

Werman has produced 23 gold and platinum albums by acts also including Blue Öyster Cult, Mother's Finest, Molly Hatchet, Mötley Crüe, Twisted Sister, Stryper, Hawks, Kix, L.A. Guns, and Poison, in addition to key recordings by Dokken, Gary Myrick & The Figures, Glass Tiger, Jason & The Scorchers, Krokus, Lita Ford, and The Producers.

Critics, including members of Cheap Trick, Mötley Crüe, and Twisted Sister, have sometimes described Werman's production style as too polished for the music. In 2008, Werman wrote to The New York Times calling bassist Nikki Sixx "totally deluded" for his criticism.

Later career
In 2002, Werman and his wife, Suky, opened Stonover Farm, a "luxury bed and breakfast" in Lenox, Massachusetts. In 2021, the Wermans sold the farm to attorney Randall Grimmett and his wife, actress and author Allison Smith.

Personal life
Werman and his wife have three children.

References

External links
 

1945 births
Living people
Record producers from Massachusetts
Businesspeople from Boston
Columbia Business School alumni
American hoteliers
Columbia College (New York) alumni